The Iran Workshop on Communication and Information Theory (IWCIT) is an international academic workshop that is held annually in one of the Iranian University campuses. The purpose of this workshop is to bring together researchers in frontiers of communication and information theory worldwide to share and engage in various research activities.

IWCIT features world-class speakers, plenary talks and technical sessions on a diverse range of topics in communication and information theory. IWCIT is the only workshop in Iran with an emphasis on information theory, and is one of the three events that is supported by the related scientific chapter in IEEE Iran section. This workshop is included in the IEEE Conference Publications Program (CPP).

History

2013
The First Iran Workshop on Communication and Information Theory (IWCIT) took place at Sharif University of Technology, Tehran, Iran from Wednesday May 8 to Thursday May 9, 2013.

Prof. Gerhard Kramer from Technische Universität München was the Keynote Speaker at IWCIT 2013.

2014
The 2nd IWCIT took place at Sharif University of Technology, Tehran, Iran from Wednesday May 7 to Thursday May 8, 2014.
Distinguished Keynote Speakers at IWCIT 2014 were Prof. Behnaam Aazhang (Department of Electrical and Computer Engineering, Rice University), Prof. David Tse (Department of Electrical Engineering and Computer Sciences, University of California at Berkeley), Prof. Robert Schober (Institute for Digital Communications, Friedrich-Alexander-Universität Erlangen-Nürnberg) and Prof. Gerhard Kramer (Institute for Communications Engineering, Technische Universität München).

2015
The 3rd IWCIT took place at Sharif University of Technology, Tehran, Iran from Wednesday May 6 to Thursday May 7, 2015.

Distinguished Keynote Speakers at IWCIT 2015 included Prof. Imre Csiszár (Alfréd Rényi Institute of Mathematics, Hungarian Academy of Sciences), Prof. Gerhard Kramer (Institute for Communications Engineering, Technische Universität München), Prof. Khaled Ben Letaief (Hong Kong University of Science and Technology) and Prof. Giuseppe Caire (Technical University of Berlin, Germany).

2016
The 4th IWCIT took place at Sharif University of Technology, Tehran, Iran on Tuesday May 3 and Wednesday May 4, 2016. The keynote speakers of the workshop were Prof. Thomas Kailath and Prof. Raymond Yeung.

Scope 
The scope of the workshop includes the following topics:
 Shannon Theory: including Complexity theory, Information theoretic security, Multi-terminal information theory and Quantum information theory
 Communication Theory: including Cognitive radio systems,  Cooperative communications, Network resource sharing and scheduling, Molecular and Nano communications, and Optical and Quantum communication theory
 Coding Theory: including Compressed sensing, Data compression, and Network coding.
 Applications of Information Theory: information theory in learning,  data mining, signal processing, statistics and biology.

External links
Workshop website

References 

IEEE conferences
Telecommunication conferences